Sang Tarashan (also Romanized as Sang Tarāshān and Sang Tarāshūn) is a village in Ghaniabad Rural District, in the Central District of Ray County, Tehran Province, Iran. At the 2006 census, its population was 120, in 32 families.

References 

Populated places in Ray County, Iran